Philonotis marchica is a species of moss belonging to the family Bartramiaceae.

This moss spicies has thin, erect stems and forms a felt-like layer. The species thrives in peat bogs, on or near the water. The moss can also float. The moss is found always in very small growing places.

It has almost cosmopolitan distribution. The moss is described as rare (in Europe). It was in the Netherlands in the national news in January 2023, after the moss was found in Weerribben-Wieden National Park.

References

Bartramiales